The following is a list of Southampton managers from the founding of Southampton F.C. in 1885 until the present. The first secretary manager of the club was Cecil Knight from 1892 to 1895; the first full-time manager of the club was George Swift from 1911 to 1912.

The most successful managers are, in terms of trophies and honours, Ernest Arnfield, with whom the club won the Southern Football League five times and the Western Football League Division 1A once; and (since the start of the Football League era), in terms of win percentage, Nigel Adkins.

The longest-serving manager has been Ted Bates from 1955 to 1973, for 850 matches. (Bates – "Mr Southampton" – had played for the club from 1937 to 1955, and also served as a club director for 20 years after managing it.)

Managers

References

Notes

Managers
 
Southampton
Southampton-related lists